Stăuceni may refer to:

 Stăuceni,  a commune in Chișinău municipality, Moldova
 Stăuceni,  a commune in Botoșani County, Romania

See also
 Stavchany, Ukrainian spelling of Stăuceni